Graduate School of eLearning, also known as GSeL, is a constituent of Assumption University of Thailand located in Suvarnabhumi area of Bangkok, Thailand. It is the first educational institution in Thailand to offer complete eLearning degree programs.

References

Distance education institutions based in Thailand
Online colleges
University departments in Thailand
Assumption University (Thailand)